Edwin Lascelles, 1st Baron Harewood (1713 – 25 January 1795) was a wealthy West Indian plantation owner and enslaver who was of English ancestry.

Early life
He was born in Barbados, the elder son of Henry Lascelles (1690–1753) and Mary Carter. His father split the family fortune, leaving Edwin's younger brother Daniel as head of the business, and raised Edwin as a lord of the manor over their English estates. He was educated at Trinity College, Cambridge and on a European Grand Tour.

Military and political service
He fought against the Jacobites (1745), and entered Parliament as MP for Scarborough from 1744 to 1754. He was later MP for Yorkshire from 1761 to 1780 and for Northallerton from 1780 to 1790 (inheriting the latter seat from his father Henry and his brother Daniel). By 1748 Edwin was installed as Lord of the Manor of Harewood and he built Harewood House from 1759 to 1771.

A great many enslavers depended on their sale of sugar and molasses to the American colonies for income.

He was made Baron Harewood, of Harewood in the County of York on 9 July 1790, but died childless and the title became extinct. The fortune passed to his cousin Edward Lascelles (1740–1820), 1st Earl of Harewood.

Marriages
He was first married to Elizabeth Dawes, daughter of Sir Darcy Dawes, 4th Baronet, on 5January 1746–47. His second marriage was to Lady Jane Fleming, daughter of William Coleman and Jane Seymour, and widow of Sir John Fleming, 1st Baronet, in 31March 1770. His stepdaughters were Jane Stanhope, Countess of Harrington and Seymour Fleming, later noted for the separation scandal involving her husband Sir Richard Worsley, 7th Baronet. A picture of Seymour still hangs in Harewood House.

References

External links
thePeerage.com
http://www.bbc.co.uk/leeds/content/articles/2007/02/22/abolition_harewood_house_feature.shtml

1713 births
1795 deaths
Alumni of Trinity College, Cambridge
Colony of Barbados people
West Indies merchants
Members of the Parliament of Great Britain for English constituencies
British MPs 1741–1747
British MPs 1747–1754
British MPs 1754–1761
British MPs 1761–1768
British MPs 1768–1774
British MPs 1774–1780
Barons in the Peerage of Great Britain
Peers of Great Britain created by George III
Edwin
British slave owners